Scott Jameson Jones (born 23 May 1954) is an American former bishop of the United Methodist Church, elected in 2004, serving until his retirement and subsequent resignation from the episcopal office in January 2023. He was born in Nashville, Tennessee and raised in Illinois, Indiana and Colorado.

Family
He met his wife, Mary Lou Reece, while a student at the University of Kansas, and they were married 18 August 1979. She is the president of Reece Construction Company, with offices in  Salina, Kansas and Prosper, Texas. The couple has three children and five grandchildren.

Jones' younger brother, L. Gregory Jones, is the Williams Professor of Theology and Christian Ministry at Duke Divinity School, Senior Fellow of the Fuqua-Coach K Center on Leadership and Ethics, and Senior Fellow of Leadership Education at Duke Divinity.

Education
Jones earned a B.A. degree in philosophy at the University of Kansas (1977 with highest honors). He is a member of Phi Beta Kappa. He earned an M.Th. degree at Perkins School of Theology, Southern Methodist University (1981 with high honors). Jones's Ph.D. is also from Southern Methodist University, which he earned in 1992 in religious studies.

Episcopal ministry
Jones was endorsed for election to the Episcopacy by the North Texas Conference Delegation to the South Central Jurisdictional Conference and was elected in July 2004. He was assigned to the Kansas Episcopal Area, with offices in Wichita, Kansas. He was initially very popular, particularly with younger members of the Kansas East and Kansas West Annual Conferences. 

Jones took over the new Great Plains Conference, which was formed in 2014 by combining the former Kansas East, Kansas West and Nebraska United Methodist conferences. 

In 2016 he was assigned to the Texas Annual Conference (Houston Area) where he served until January 2023.

In January of 2023 Scott Jones resigned as a Bishop of the UMC and withdrew his conference membership to unite with The Global Methodist Church.

Selected writings
John Wesley's Conception and Use of Scripture, Nashville, Kingswood Books/Abingdon, 1995.
Wesley and the Quadrilateral: Renewing the Conversation (with S. Gunter, T. Campbell, R. Miles and R. Maddox), Nashville, Abingdon, 1997.
United Methodist Doctrine: The Extreme Center, Nashville, Abingdon, 2002.
The Evangelistic Love of God and Neighbor: A Theology of Witness and Discipleship, Nashville, Abingdon, 2003. 
The Wesleyan Way, Nashville, Abingdon, 2013. 
Ask: Faith Questions in a Skeptical Age (with Arthur D. Jones), Nashville, Abingdon, 2015.
Scripture and the Wesleyan Way (with Arthur D. Jones), Nashville, Abingdon, 2018.

See also
 List of bishops of the United Methodist Church

References

External links
Bishop Jones' Official Biography
A 2004 Photo of Bishop Jones
Bishop Jones' page at Kansas East Annual Conference Website
Bishop Jones' page at Kansas West Annual Conference Website
InfoServ, the official information service of The United Methodist Church
The Council of Bishops of the United Methodist Church
Photo of Bishop Jones from UMC.org
Bishop Jones' page at Texas Annual Conference Website

20th-century American theologians
American religion academics
American United Methodist bishops
Methodist theologians
Southern Methodist University alumni
Duke Divinity School alumni
1954 births
Living people
21st-century Methodist ministers
20th-century Methodist ministers